Sarmur (also Romanized as Sarmūr) is a village in Ravar Rural District, in the Central District of Ravar County, Kerman Province, Iran. At the 2006 census, its population was 14, in 5 families.

References 

Populated places in Ravar County